Möser or Moeser is a German name. Notable people with the surname include:

 Hans Möser (1906–1948), German Nazi SS concentration camp officer executed for war crimes
 James Moeser (born 1939), the ninth chancellor of the University of North Carolina at Chapel Hill
 Justus Möser (1720–1794), German jurist and social theorist
 Ron Moeser, City Councillor in Toronto, Canada

See also
 Moser (disambiguation)

German-language surnames